Bostra obsoletalis is a species of moth in the family Pyralidae described by Josef Johann Mann in 1864. It is found in southern Europe, Yemen, Sudan, the Palestinian territories, Tunisia and Morocco.

The wingspan is 14–15 mm. Adults are on wing from June to August.

References

External links
lepiforum.de

Moths described in 1864
Pyralini
Moths of the Arabian Peninsula
Moths of Europe
Moths of Africa
Moths of the Middle East